Statistics of Swedish football Division 3 for the 1940–41 season.

League standings

Uppsvenska Sydöstra 1940–41

Uppsvenska Sydvästra 1940–41

Östsvenska Norra 1940–41

Östsvenska Södra 1940–41

Centralserien Norra 1940–41

Centralserien Södra 1940–41

Nordvästra Norra 1940–41

Nordvästra Södra 1940–41

Mellansvenska Norra 1940–41

Mellansvenska Södra 1940–41

Sydöstra Norra 1940–41

Sydöstra Södra 1940–41

Västsvenska Norra 1940–41

Västsvenska Södra 1940–41

Sydsvenska Norra 1940–41

Sydsvenska Södra 1940–41

Footnotes

References 

Swedish Football Division 3 seasons
3
Swed